Roman Čechmánek (born March 2, 1971) is a Czech former professional ice hockey goaltender. He played professionally in the United States, Czech Republic, and Germany, including in the National Hockey League with the Philadelphia Flyers and Los Angeles Kings from 2000 to 2004. Internationally Čechmánek played for the Czech national team at multiple international tournaments, including seven World Championships. He was born in Gottwaldov, Czechoslovakia.

Playing career

He played for HC Vsetín in the Czech Republic from 1994 to 2000. He was drafted in the sixth round as the 171st overall pick of the 2000 NHL Entry Draft by the Philadelphia Flyers. In his first season with the Flyers, Čechmánek surprised many by capturing the starting job from Brian Boucher and being one of the best goaltenders in the league. In his first season, he played in the NHL All-Star Game and finished second in voting for the Vezina Trophy. He had a disappointing playoffs, however, including allowing five goals in an embarrassing 8–0 loss in the final game of the Flyers' first round series against the Buffalo Sabres.

The next season Čechmánek had another good year and played fairly well in the first round of the playoffs. However the Philadelphia offense failed, scoring a record low number of only two goals in five games against the Ottawa Senators. Čechmánek was publicly annoyed at his teammates' performance. The next year he had another superior season, sharing the William M. Jennings Trophy with Flyers teammate Robert Esche, and Martin Brodeur of the New Jersey Devils. Čechmánek pitched two shutouts in a second round loss to Ottawa but many blamed him for the loss due to the number of soft goals he allowed in the other four games. At the end of the season he was traded to the Los Angeles Kings for a second-round draft pick.

Playing behind a mediocre Kings team, Čechmánek had a disappointing season in 2003–04. He returned to the Czech Republic to play with his old team HC Vsetín during the cancelled 2004–05 NHL season. He split the 2005–06 hockey season between HC Karlovy Vary and the Hamburg Freezers. In the beginning of 2007, Čechmánek left Linköpings HC and was replaced by Rastislav Staňa. He then  played for HC Třinec in the Czech Extraliga for three seasons. He retired following the 2008–09 season.

International play
He was on the Czech national team at both the 1998 Winter Olympics and 2002 Winter Olympics, but did not play any games, instead serving as backup togoaltender Dominik Hašek. Čechmánek won a gold medal in 1998. His other appearances were in the 1995, 1996, 1997, 1999, 2000, 2004 and 2007 World Championships.

Career statistics

Regular season and playoffs

International

Transactions
Selected by the Philadelphia Flyers in the sixth round (third Flyers pick, 171st overall) of the NHL Entry Draft – 24 June 2000.
Traded by Flyers to the Los Angeles Kings for a second-round selection in 2004 entry draft – 28 May 2003.
Signed with Vsetínská Hokejová (Czech Extraliga) during NHL lockout on – 17 September 2004.
Signed as a free agent by HC Energie Karlovy Vary (Czech Extraliga) – 16 August 2005.

Honours
Named Best Goaltender at the World Championships – 2000.
Named to the All-Star Team at the World Championships – 2000.
Played in National Hockey League All-Star Game – 2001.
Named to National Hockey League All-Star Second Team – 2000–01.
William M. Jennings Trophy (shared with Martin Brodeur and teammate Robert Esche) – 2002–03.

References

External links
 

1971 births
Living people
Czech ice hockey goaltenders
Czechoslovak ice hockey goaltenders
Hamburg Freezers players
HC Dukla Jihlava players
SHK Hodonín players
HC Karlovy Vary players
HC Oceláři Třinec players
HC Olomouc players
VHK Vsetín players
PSG Berani Zlín players
Linköping HC players
Los Angeles Kings players
National Hockey League All-Stars
Sportspeople from Zlín
Philadelphia Flyers draft picks
Philadelphia Flyers players
Philadelphia Phantoms players
William M. Jennings Trophy winners
Olympic gold medalists for the Czech Republic
Czech expatriate ice hockey players in the United States
Czech expatriate ice hockey players in Sweden
Czech expatriate ice hockey players in Germany